The Violence Suppression Unit (VSU)  is a  Frontline Policing Directorate, formerly known as Territorial Policing, unit of London's Metropolitan Police Service (MPS). Its role is to combat street crime, violence and knife offences as well as track down high harm fugitives.

The VSU was constructed in 2020 to amalgamate the previous proactive and Borough Crime Squads under one umbrella.

Each of the 12 Borough Operational Command Unit(BOCU) have a VSU who patrol in plain clothes and unmarked vehicles as well as in marked police vans or "carriers". Each VSU has  approximately 50 officers, predominantly PCs despite being a part of the Criminal Investigation Department (CID).

Officers attached to the VSU tend to be experienced officers who are trained in police driving, public order and both the covert and overt carriage of taser.

Role 
The VSU will have two aspects: The proactive, crime squad, element and the mobilisation and visible aspect.

Remit of the VSU

Support delivering Pan-London days of action.

Conducting High Risk/High Harm arrests.

Conducting Manhunt and fugitive tracking for High Risk wanted offenders.

Search warrant (raid) execution 

Crime in action response, responding to 999 calls concerning knife crime, gang violence and robbery.

Targeted disruption activity against High Risk High Harm offenders including stop and search.

Proactive element

The pro-active element will enable activity against High Harm offenders. Knife carriers, robbery suspects and prolific violent offenders as well as higher level drug offenders (Dealers - suppliers).

The VSU undertake longer term proactive work against individuals or groups driving drugs or violence.

Developing intelligence with the MO2 - Intelligence staff who will be on a BOCU.

Visibility/ Mobilisation

This element is the uniform visibility and mobilisation team.  This element will support reassurance and suppression work in hot spot areas by patrolling in marked police vehicles.

They will be used to support arrest attempts for violent individuals.

Knife Arches, Passive Drugs dogs and weapon sweeps will be conducted in high crime areas.

Officers are often trained in Method of Entry and Rapid Entry. A part of the remit of the VSU is also facilitating Search Warrants on behalf of the BOCU

Equipment and vehicles 
Each VSU should be equipped with at least 2 high visibility marked police minibuses with response capability. They are also equipped with at least 3 “Q” unmarked covert cars with response capability. They will also have shared access to protected police vans and personnel carriers.

Like all front line police officers, VSU officers are equipped with Speedcuffs, collapsible batons and CS/PAVA Incapacitant Spray. They also have the capability to carry the X2 Taser. There is also an expectation for all VSU officers to be trained in Level 2 Public Order (Riot Training) and Rapid Entry.

Individual BOCUs may choose to equip their VSU officers with other equipment such as kit for specialist entry and tyre deflation devices (Spike strip).

Some VSU teams have trialed fitting a dog cage within VSU unmarked vehicles. This can be utilised with a dedicated Police Dog Handler to assist the VSU when required.

Recruitment 
Officers wanting to join the VSU are selected from BOCU officers by a submission of interest supported by a line manager. There may be an interview process and desirable attributes include:

Experience in proactive policing

Understanding of RIPA

Understanding in manhunts and fugitive hunting.

Level two public order trained

Rapid entry trained

Taser trained, covert or standard

Police Driver, Advanced or Response.

During the initial phase of recruitment officers from anywhere on the MPS where allowed to apply to address a shortage of volunteers from BOCU. This has now ended and applicants can only transfer from BOCU.

Criticism 
Similar to the TSG and their predecessors, the SPG, the VSU have been criticised for racial profiling and the use of stop and search. After the conception of the VSU Stop and Search has increased by 8%.

The VSU was predicted to be racially disproportionate prior to its conception and the Metropolitan Police considered whether it would go ahead.

The VSUs have also been likened to the unit of the same name founded in California.  The Merced Police Department (PD) established a Gang VSU in 1994, the Salinas PD founded its VSU in 1995 and Concord PD's VSU date back to 2015. These have been criticised for their aggressive patrol strategies.

Leadership 
The VSU is part of the Front Line Policing Directive and as such is led by the senior leadership team of the  Borough Operational Command Unit(BOCU).

The VSU teams will be run by a police sergeant and a Detective or Police Inspector under the  Criminal Investigation Department (CID).

References 

Metropolitan Police units
2020 establishments in England